The Sailfin snake-eel (Letharchus rosenblatti, also known as the Black sailfin eel in Mexico) is an eel in the family Ophichthidae (worm/snake eels). It was described by John E. McCosker in 1974. It is a marine, tropical eel which is known from the eastern central and southeastern Pacific Ocean, including Colombia, Ecuador, Costa Rica, Panama and Mexico.

Due to a lack of known major threats and lack of observed population decline, the IUCN redlist currently lists the Sailfin snake-eel as Least Concern.

References

Ophichthidae
Fish described in 1974